The Love Trap is a 1929 American comedy film directed by William Wyler and starring Laura La Plante, Neil Hamilton and Robert Ellis. It was made as a part-sound film, with a soundtrack for the last few scenes.

Synopsis
A young woman meets a millionaire, but his family suspect her of being a gold digger.

Cast
 Laura La Plante as Evelyn Todd  
 Neil Hamilton as Paul Harrington  
 Robert Ellis as Guy Emory  
 Jocelyn Lee as Bunny  
 Norman Trevor as Judge Harrington  
 Clarissa Selwynne as Mrs. Harrington  
 Rita La Roy as Mary Harrington

References

Bibliography
 Dick, Bernard F. City of Dreams: The Making and Remaking of Universal Pictures. University Press of Kentucky, 2015.

External links

1929 films
Films directed by William Wyler
1929 comedy films
1920s English-language films
American black-and-white films
Silent American comedy films
Universal Pictures films
1920s American films